Leonotis nepetifolia, (also known as klip dagga, Christmas candlestick, or lion's ear), is a species of plant in the genus Leonotis and the family Lamiaceae (mint). It is native to tropical Africa and southern India. It can also be found growing abundantly in much of Latin America, the West Indies, and the Southeastern United States. Sunbirds and ants are attracted to the flowers. It has been found growing on road sides, rubbish heaps or waste land.

L. nepetifolia is considered an invasive plant in Australia, Florida, and Hawaii, though its tendency to grow in disturbed areas led researchers in Hawaii to conclude it's not likely to be an ecological threat.

Varieties
Leonotis nepetifolia var. africana (P.Beauv.) J.K.Morton - Indian Subcontinent, much of Africa (light orange flowers)
Leonotis nepetifolia var. nepetifolia - much of Africa (dark solid orange flowers)
Leonotis nepetifolia var. alba - (albino/white flowers)

Related species 
Leonotis  nepetifolia (klip dagga) is related to L. leonurus (wild dagga or lion's tail.) The most noticeable difference between the two is the leaf shape. L. nepetifolia leaves are cordate with serrated edges, except the top pair which are lanceolate with serrated edges, as pictured in taxonomy box. The leaves are all lanceolate with serrated edges on L. leonurus.

Traditional medicine 
Leonotis nepetifolia is known in Trinidad as shandilay and the leaves are brewed as a tea for fever, coughs, womb prolapse and malaria. The dried leaves and flowers (the flowers being the most potent part) are sometimes used as a legal substitute for marijuana. The roots of L. nepetifolia are considered to be the botanical sources of granthiparna, an ayurvedic herb.

Phytochemicals and Pharmacology
Leonotis nepetifolia contains several labdane diterpenes including Nepetaefolin, Nepetaefuran, Nepetaefolin, Nepetaefolin, Leonotinin, Leonotin and Dubiin as well as bis-spirolabdane diterpenes like Leonepetaefolin A-E.

Methanol based extracts of Leonotis nepetifolia has shown antidepressant-like effects in mice. Metabolic screening of the extract suggested nepetaefolin, methoxynepataefolin, and 7-O-β-glucoside luteolin are the main products.

Nepetaefuran and leonotinin isolated from Leonotis nepetaefolia plant material demonstrated anti-inflammatory by suppressing NF-κB activation related to proinflammatory Cytokines.

Gallery

References

External links 
 FloraBase - Information on L. nepetifolia in Western Australia
 Information on cultivating ethnoplants cultivating L.nepetifolia (French)

Lamiaceae
Flora of Africa
Flora of the Indian subcontinent
Medicinal plants
Entheogens
Plants described in 1753
Taxa named by Carl Linnaeus
Garden plants of Africa